"Jesus Christus, unser Heiland, der den Tod überwand" is a hymn for Easter by Martin Luther. The text originated in 1524. Johannes Zahn listed three hymn tunes for it. Two of these, Zahn Nos. 1976 and 1977, were published in 1724. A third, Zahn No. 1978, is attributed to Luther and was first published in 1529. Variants of this melody originated up to the early 17th century.

Text
Below is the original German version of the text
Jesus Christus unser Heiland,
der den Tod überwand,
ist auferstanden,
die Sünd hat er gefangen.
Kyrie eleison.

Der ohn Sünden war geboren,
trug für uns Gottes Zorn,
hat uns versöhnet,
dass Gott uns sein Huld gönnet.
Kyrie eleison.

Tod, Sünd, Leben und auch Gnad,
alls in Händen er hat;
er kann erretten
alle, die zu ihm treten.
Kyrie eleison.

An English translation of the first stanza by George MacDonald :
Jesus Christ, our Saviour true, 
He who Death overthrew, 
Is up arisen, 
And sin hath put in prison. 
Kyrieleison.

Settings
One of the early melodies for "Jesus Christus, unser Heiland, der den Tod überwand" appeared in the Erfurt Enchiridion. The later hymn tune, Zahn No. 1978, was adopted, for instance, in compositions by Johann Sebastian Bach.

Erfurt Enchiridion (1524)
The 1524 Erfurt Enchiridion contained the hymn with the Zahn No. 1977 melody:

Zahn No. 1978
Two four-part settings of the 1529 melody of the hymn were included in Samuel Scheidt's 1650 Görlitzer Tabulaturbuch (SSWV 441-540). Further chorale preludes for organ were composed by Friedrich Wilhelm Zachow (LV 36), by Johann Pachelbel (PC 60) and by Johann Sebastian Bach (BWV 626 in the Orgelbüchlein).

Johann Sebastian Bach also wrote a chorale harmonization (BWV 364):

See also

List of hymns by Martin Luther

References

Sources
 "Jesus Christus, unser Heiland, der den Tod überwand," pp. 160–161 in D. Martin Luthers Werke. Kritische Gesamtausgabe Volume 35 by Wilhelm Lucke (ed.) Weimar 1923.
 "102 – Jesus Christus, unser Heiland, der den Tod überwand," pp. 56–60 in Liederkunde zum Evangelischen Gesangbuch Nr. 3 by Gerhard Hahn and Jürgen Henkys (eds.) Göttingen: Vandenhoeck & Ruprecht, 2001.

External links
 "Jesus Christus, unser Heiland, der den Tod überwand" at 
 

Lutheran hymns
16th-century hymns in German
Hymns by Martin Luther
Easter hymns
Songs about Jesus